Fritz Kristoffersen (8 November 1917 – 14 December 2005) was a Norwegian footballer. He played in one match for the Norway national football team in 1946.

References

External links
 

1917 births
2005 deaths
Norwegian footballers
Norway international footballers
Place of birth missing
Association footballers not categorized by position